Bacon is a ghost town in Lincoln County, Kansas, United States.

History
Bacon was issued a post office in 1879. The post office was discontinued in 1902.

References

Former populated places in Lincoln County, Kansas
Former populated places in Kansas